Wheaton, located in Wheaton, Illinois, was the western terminus of the Chicago Aurora and Elgin Railroad's main line, after which it split into two branches bound for Aurora and Elgin. It opened in 1902 alongside the rest of what was then called the "Aurora Elgin and Chicago Railroad" (AE&C), which at the time only extended eastward to 52nd Avenue in Chicago.

History
The right of way acquired by the AE&C ended up paralleling that of the Chicago and North Western (C&NW, the modern-day Union Pacific West Line), and it was decided to construct its Wheaton station adjacent to the C&NW's station. The AE&C, including Wheaton station, openeds on August 25, 1902. The Elgin branch of the AE&C opened in 1903.

The AE&C quickly grew and the station was expanded in 1911. The AE&C became the CA&E in the 1920s.

Closure and demolition
Having been rendered unprofitable by developments in the 1950s, the CA&E closed passenger service on the afternoon of July 3, 1957. The railroad decided to rent out its stations afterwards; Wheaton was leased to the DuPage County Democratic Party, whose headquarters it served. It was later demolished.

Station details
The 1911 station was designed by H. R. Wilson and Company. Between 1903 and 1914, trains left Chicago alternating between Aurora and Elgin; afterwards, trains proceeded west to Wheaton, where they were split with the front halves going to Aurora and the rear halves going to Elgin.

References

1902 establishments in Illinois
1957 disestablishments in Illinois
Former Chicago, Aurora, and Elgin stations